The Fraunhofer Institute for Open Communication Systems, or FOKUS, is an organization of the Fraunhofer Society. Headquartered in Berlin (Charlottenburg), the institute is engaged in applied research and development in the field of Information and Communications Technology. The institute is jointly led by Prof. Manfred Hauswirth and Dr. Tom Ritter. Manfred Hauswirth also holds a chair in at the Technische Universität Berlin. Dr. Tom Ritter is the institute’s deputy director.

History
FOKUS was founded in 1988 as a research establishment for Open Communication Systems and an institute of the former "Gesellschaft für Mathematik und Datenverarbeitung GmbH" (GMD, Society for Mathematics and Data Processing). Since the merger of GMD with Fraunhofer in July 2001, FOKUS has been an institute of the Fraunhofer Society. In 2012, the three ICT institutes FOKUS, FIRST and ISST Berlin were brought together under the name of Fraunhofer FOKUS.

In October 2014, Prof. Dr. Manfred Hauswirth was appointed Director of the Fraunhofer Institute for Open Communication Systems FOKUS in Berlin. The Executive Board of the Fraunhofer-Gesellschaft has decided to appoint Dr. Tom Ritter as Deputy Director of the Fraunhofer Institute for Open Communication Systems FOKUS. The computer scientist took over his position in November 2019 and supports the managing director of the institute, Prof. Dr. Manfred Hauswirth, in his various tasks.

Main research areas
Fraunhofer FOKUS develops vendor-neutral solutions for ICT systems. The institute focusses on practice-oriented research and development of digital interconnectivity. Fraunhofer FOKUS cooperates with business enterprises and public administration to support digitisation through research.  It also carries out research into some of the key challenges to social development and the smart cities of the future, such as access to information, the sustainable and efficient use of resources, networked mobility and a modern public administration system. Research activities focus on inter-operable, user-centred domain and inter-organizational solutions.

The Session Initiation  Protocol (SIP), for example, which has become the standard for Voice over IP and Internet telephony, was originally developed at Fraunhofer FOKUS. Fraunhofer FOKUS also played a significant role in the introduction of the new ID card in Germany in 2010.

Business Units
The success of the institute is based on an organization comprising different business units:
 ASCT designs and develops software and ICT systems for the automotive industry, with a particular emphasis on Car2X communication and 5G. 
 ESPRI design and development of logistics information technologies for civil protection, disaster control and public safety and security.
 DPS Consulting, design and development of e-government solutions for politics, administration and business, together with the implementation of architectures and standards.
 FAME develops interactive web technologies, with an emphasis on cross-platform applications, smart media, IPTV and personalized entertainment.
 NGNI develops 5G testbeds, 5G core networks (Open5GCore practical implementation), data management, factory shop floor fixed and mobile communication 
 SQC Methods, processes and tools for the development and quality assurance of software-intense systems that often perform business-critical or security- and safety-relevant functions in urban infrastructures.
 VISCOM real-time capable algorithms for the visualization, tracking, data fusion and interaction in intuitive assistance systems and user interfaces.

Infrastructure
In 2019, FOKUS employed 450 people, including 170 students and interns. The Fraunhofer FOKUS budget in 2019 was 33 million euros.  23.2 million euros was spent on personnel, 8.3 million euros on equipment and materials and 0.9 million euros on investments.

References

External links 
 Official website of Fraunhofer Institute for Open Communication Systems (FOKUS)
 Official website of Fraunhofer Society

Fraunhofer Society
Organisations based in Berlin
Information technology in Germany
Buildings and structures in Charlottenburg-Wilmersdorf
Research institutes established in 2001